Dion Keith Jenkins (born September 21, 1979) better known by his mononym as Dion is an American singer-songwriter and record producer perhaps best known for frequently collaborating with Aftermath Entertainment recording artists The Game, 50 Cent and Young Buck. He has also worked with several other prominent rappers, such as Talib Kweli, Bishop Lamont, 213 (Snoop Dogg, Warren G, Nate Dogg), Xzibit, and Freeway among many others.

Early life 
Jenkins was born and raised in Cincinnati, Ohio. Jenkins attended Central State University where he earned himself a degree in Performance Music.

Music career 

Dion's first foray into the industry was via the R&B group Jonz who released a record in 1999 henceforth gaining notoriety on BET's "The Way We Do It" but it wasn't until being brought on board via an audition with Cincinnati-based producer Hi-Tek sponsored by Def Jam and MCA records, that solidified his position as one of Hip Hop's go to crooners. Shortly thereafter Dion gained the attention of West Coast Hip Hop pioneer Dr. Dre who invited him to work with The Game for Game's debut album The Documentary. Now can be found on Twitter and YouTube using the name DeionTheFuture.

Discography

Studio albums 
 Throwback Joints (Album) (2022)  released on Spotify
 Break the Circle (TBA 2018)
 Time Wasted (2016)
 Don't Stop (2004) 
 Aftermath Album (Unreleased)
 Hi-Tek Album (Unreleased)
 Jonz (Album) (1999)

Music videos

References

External links 

Dion Jenkins @ Discogs

1979 births
Living people
American male singer-songwriters
Record producers from Ohio
21st-century American singers
21st-century American male singers
American singer-songwriters